The 2015–16 season of the Oberliga Hamburg, the highest association football league in the German state of Hamburg, was the eighth season of the league at tier five (V) of the German football league system.

The season began on 31 July 2015 and finished on 21 May 2016, interrupted by a winter break from 19 December to 31 January.

2015–16 standings 										
The 2015–16 season saw three new clubs in the league, SV Lurup, FC Türkiye and WTSV Concordia, all promoted from the Landesligas while no club had been relegated from the Regionalliga Nord to the league. 

Of the Oberliga Hamburg teams only Altona 93 applied for a Regionalliga licence for the 2016–17 season, with the Northern German Football Association deciding on 9 May 2016 to grant all applicants a licence.

Top goalscorers
The top goal scorers for the season:

Promotion play-off
Promotion play-off were to be held at the end of the season to the Regionalliga Nord. The runners-up of the Niedersachsenliga and the champions or, in Hamburg's case, the only team applying for a licence, of the Bremen-Liga, Oberliga Hamburg and Schleswig-Holstein-Liga played each other for two more spot in the Regionalliga. In the promotion round each team met the other just once with the two highest-placed teams in the final table promoted:

References

External links 
 Oberliga Hamburg on Fupa.net 

Oberliga Hamburg
Hamburg